Robert Brownlee Currey (1774–1848) was an American Jeffersonian Republican politician. He served as the Mayor of Nashville, Tennessee from 1822 to 1824.

Early life
Robert Brownlee Currey was born in 1774.

Career
Currey served as the first United States Postmaster in Nashville. From 1822 to 1824, he served as Mayor of Nashville.

Personal life and death
Currey was married to Jane Gray Owen. They had eight children, Richard Owen Currey (1816-1865), Algernon B. (d. 1815, 7 months old), Robert B. (1817-1860), William Hume (1818-1831), Algernon S., Washington J., John, and Elizabeth Jane. He died on December 8, 1848 in Nashville.

References

1774 births
1848 deaths
Mayors of Nashville, Tennessee